Liz O'Donnell (born 1 July 1956) is a former Irish Progressive Democrats politician, who represented Dublin South as a Teachta Dála (TD) from 1992 to 2007.

Early and personal life
O'Donnell was born in Dublin in 1956, where her father worked for Guinness. She moved with her family to Limerick when she was 11. She was educated at the Salesian Convent, Limerick, and Trinity College Dublin, where she was an honours graduate of the Law School in 1981. Prior to embarking on a political career, O'Donnell was a Vice Chair of the Women's Political Association and a delegate to the National Women's Council. O'Donnell is divorced and has 2 children.

Political career
In 1991, she was elected to Dublin City Council for the Progressive Democrats for the Rathmines local electoral area. She served on the council until 1994.

At the 1992 general election, she was elected to Dáil Éireann for the Progressive Democrats, representing Dublin South. She was opposition spokesperson on Health and Social Welfare from 1992 to 1993. She was Party whip and Justice spokesperson from 1993 to 1997. Following her return to the 28th Dáil at the 1997 general election, she negotiated the Programme for the Coalition Government between Fianna Fáil and the Progressive Democrats, along with her party colleague Minister of State Bobby Molloy.

O'Donnell was appointed Minister of State at the Department of Foreign Affairs with responsibility for Overseas Development Assistance and Human Rights. She was among the representatives of the Irish Government at the multi-party talks at Stormont, which culminated in the Good Friday Agreement in 1998. She was also a member of the Cabinet sub-committee on Asylum Immigration and related matters. Following the resignation of Bobby Molloy she was appointed Minister of State to the Government in April 2002.

She was re-elected to the 29th Dáil at the 2002 general election as TD for Dublin South. In December 2002, she was awarded the Doolin Memorial Medal for her contribution to Overseas Development and Human Rights. She was the Deputy Leader of the Progressive Democrats from 2006 to 2007. She lost her seat at the 2007 general election.

Since leaving public office, she has worked in the media and in public affairs consultancy.

In 2015 O'Donnell was appointed to chair the Road Safety Authority.

References

External links

1956 births
Living people
Alumni of Trinity College Dublin
Local councillors in Dublin (city)
Members of the 27th Dáil
Members of the 28th Dáil
Members of the 29th Dáil
20th-century women Teachtaí Dála
21st-century women Teachtaí Dála
Ministers of State of the 28th Dáil
Politicians from County Dublin
Progressive Democrats TDs
Women ministers of state of the Republic of Ireland